Acton-Boxborough Regional High School (ABRHS) is an open-enrollment high school in Acton, Massachusetts, United States. A part of the Acton-Boxborough Regional School District, it serves the Massachusetts towns of Acton and Boxborough and has students in grades 9 through 12. It is situated downhill from the Raymond J. Grey Junior High School, at 36 Charter Road in Acton. Raymond J. Grey Junior High School occupies the facility that, until 1973, was the high school

In 1999 multiple fires were set at ABRHS. The first fire began near the gymnasium but was quickly extinguished. The second fire, a five-alarm blaze in the school auditorium, seriously damaged the auditorium and forced the evacuation of all 1,300 students and canceled school the following day. No students or staff were injured, but one firefighters was hospitalized after suffering from smoke inhalation. ABRHS underwent a $40 million renovation and expansion in 2005

Notable alumni

Seth Abramson, poet
Tom Barrasso, Hall of Fame NHL goalie, 2x Stanley Cup Champion, 2002 Winter Olympics Silver medalist
Bob Brooke, NHL player
Jamie Eldridge, MA Senator
Steve Hathaway, MLB pitcher
Drew Houston, founder of Dropbox
Skylar Kergil, LGBTQ activist, public speaker, YouTube vlogger, and musician
Maria Konnikova, writer, professional poker player, and journalist
Shin Lim, magician, America's Got Talent Season 13 and America's Got Talent: The Champions winner
Bill Morrissey, Grammy-nominated American folk singer-songwriter
Jeff Norton, NHL hockey player
Caroll Spinney, Sesame Street puppeteer who performed Big Bird
Evelyn Stevens, cyclist
Bob Sweeney, Retired NHL player, President of Boston Bruins Foundation
Jessamyn West, librarian

References

External links

ABRHS Homepage

Public high schools in Massachusetts
Schools in Middlesex County, Massachusetts
Buildings and structures in Acton, Massachusetts
School buildings completed in 1973
1973 establishments in Massachusetts